Colin Grzanna is a German international rugby union player, playing for the Berliner RC in the Rugby-Bundesliga and the German national rugby union team. He is captain and player-coach of his club team and has also captained the German team at times.

Biography
Colin Grzanna started playing rugby when he was five years old, in 1984, playing with his South African cousins.

He is currently playing for Berliner Rugby Club, where he also covers a coaching role, together with Gerrit van Look, another player of the German national team.

Although playing for Berlin for the most part of his career, Grzanna spent the 2000 season with the Northwood Crusaders in Durban, South Africa before returning to Berlin again.

He was part of the German Sevens side at the World Games 2005 in Duisburg, where Germany finished 8th.

He filled in as German captain for an injured Jens Schmidt in late 2007 and early 2008. Himself injured later in the year, suffering a broken hand and requiring pins after the game against SC Neuenheim on 13 September 2008, he planned to retire from the national team but, according to his captain Schmidt, he loves the game too much and Germany needs his skills too badly for him to retire.

His greatest success as a national team player was the promotion to Division 1 of the European Nations Cup in 2008. In an interview after the promotion-winning game, which he captained, he stated that, in his opinion, this was the greatest moment in German rugby in almost 30 years.

Grzanna voiced his anger with the image of the game in Germany, where it is often unfairly associated with only being played by rough individuals. He considers it the perfect game, as – he says – there is a position for everybody in the game, regardless of someone's size or height.

Grzanna last played for Germany on 2 May 2009, against Russia, and has since retired from the national team.

Personal life
Like most of his fellow German team mates, Grzanna is an amateur rugby player and a surgeon by profession. He studied human medicine at the Charite Universitätsmedizin in Berlin from 2000 to 2007 and now works as a consultant surgeon. Apart from German, he is also fluent in English and French.

Honours

National team
 European Nations Cup – Division 2
 Champions: 2008

Stats
Colin Grzanna's personal statistics in club and international rugby:

Club

 As of 30 April 2012

National team

European Nations Cup

Friendlies & other competitions

 As of 25 February 2010

References

External links
 Interview with Colin Grzanna on the IRB website
  Colin Grzanna profile at totalrugby.de
 Colin Grzanna profile at the World Games 2005 website
 Colin Grzanna profile at the Berliner RC website

1979 births
Living people
German rugby union coaches
German rugby union players
Germany international rugby union players
Berliner RC players
Rugby union centres
German surgeons
Sportspeople from Berlin
German expatriate rugby union players
Expatriate rugby union players in South Africa
German expatriate sportspeople in South Africa